"High Energy" is a song co-written and co-produced by Ian Levine (British) and Fiachra Trench (Irish), and performed by American dance singer Evelyn Thomas. The song was very popular in dance clubs around the world and topped the American dance chart in September 1984. It also spent four weeks atop the singles chart in West Germany and peaked at number 5 in the UK. It became one of the earliest successful songs within the genre of music that has come to be known as Hi-NRG. On the SoBe Music compilation album Gay Classics, Volume 1: Ridin' the Rainbow, the liner notes describe the song as "...engagingly captur[ing] the spirit of the genre through uplifting lyrics tightly fused with dazzling synth work".

Music video
There are two different videos versions of the song. The original featured Thomas standing on a platform performing the song while everyone around her is dancing. The second, which was done for the American syndicated series New York Hot Tracks, featured Thomas with a different set of dancers that was filmed at a New York City nightclub, with two dancers acting out the song’s lyrics.

Impact and legacy
In 2022, American magazine Rolling Stone ranked "High Energy" number 177 in their list of 200 Greatest Dance Songs of All Time.

Track listings
 7" single
 "High Energy" – 3:48
 "High Energy" (instrumental dub) – 3:30

 12" maxi
 "High Energy" (vocal) – 7:50
 "High Energy" (instrumental dub) – 7:28

Charts

Weekly charts

Year-end charts

See also
List of number-one dance hits (United States)
Number-one hits of 1984 (Germany)

References

1984 singles
Evelyn Thomas songs
European Hot 100 Singles number-one singles
Number-one singles in Germany
Songs written by Ian Levine
Songs written by Fiachra Trench
Ariola Records singles
1984 songs
Song recordings produced by Ian Levine